Vistula Land, or Vistula Country, was the name applied to the lands of Congress Poland from 1867, following the defeats of the November Uprising (1830–31) and January Uprising (1863–1864) as it was increasingly stripped of autonomy and incorporated into Imperial Russia. It also continued to be formally known as the Kingdom of Poland until the fall of the Russian Empire.

Russia lost control of the region in 1915, during the course of the First World War. Following the 1917 October Revolution, it was officially ceded to the Central Powers under the terms of the 1918 Treaty of Brest-Litovsk.

History
In 1831, in the aftermath of the November Uprising, the Polish Army, the Constitution of the Kingdom of Poland, its parliament (Sejm) and local self-administration were disbanded. The constitution was replaced by the much less liberal and never fully implemented Organic Statute of the Kingdom of Poland. Also all universities were closed, and replaced several years later by purely Russian-language high schools.

For a short time the territory maintained certain degree of autonomy. The former Kingdom of Poland continued to use the Polish currency (złoty) and the Administrative Council retained some of its privileges (although it was directly controlled by the Russian governor Field Marshal Ivan Paskevich). However, by 1832 the currency and the customs border were abolished, as was the metric system and the Polish penal code (which was replaced by the Russian penal code, de facto in use since the Uprising began). Also the Catholic Church was persecuted and most monasteries were closed and nationalized. In 1839, following the Synod of Polotsk, the Greek Catholic Church disbanded itself and united with the Russian Orthodox Church.

After 1837 all voivodeships that constituted the Kingdom of Poland were turned into gubernias and became an integral part of Russian administrative division, ruled directly by the Russian tsars.

After the January Uprising in 1863, the coat of arms of the Congress Kingdom was abandoned, the Polish language was banned from office and education and the process of incorporation of the Polish gubernias and Russification of its administration was completed.

The 1867 reform, initiated after the failure of the January Uprising, was designed to tie the Kingdom of Poland more tightly to the administration structure of the Russian Empire. It divided larger governorates into smaller ones and introduced a new lower-level entity, gminas. There were 10 Governorates: five on the right bank of the Vistula River—Сувалкская (Suvalkskaya), Ломжинская (Lomzhinskaya), Плоцкая (Plotskaya), Седлецкая (Sedletskaya) and Люблинская (Lublinskaya)—and the remaining five on the left bank: Калишская (Kalishskaya), Варшавская (Varshavskaya), Петроковская (Petrokovskaya), Радомская (Radomskaya) and Келецкая (Keletskaya).

The coat of arms of the Kingdom of Poland was abolished at this time.

Despite the abolition of the Kingdom of Poland, the tsars of Russia retained the title "Tsar of Poland".

The territory was a namestnichestvo until 1875 and later Governorate General, ruled by the Namestniks and Governor Generals of Poland.

In the 1880s, the official language was changed to Russian, and Polish was banned both from official use and education.

The name Vistula Land first appeared in official documents in 1888 although more recent scholarship traced it back to 1883.

A minor reform of 1893 transferred some territory from the Płock and Łomża Governorates to Warsaw Governorate. A more extensive 1912 reform created a new governorate—Chełm Governorate (Kholmskaya Guberniya in Russian)—from parts of the Siedlce and Lublin Governorates. However this was split off from the Privislinsky Krai and made part of the Southwestern Krai of the Russian Empire, in order to facilitate its russification.

World War I 

The First World War initially expanded Russian control of Poland after the Imperial Russian Army scored a series of early defeats against Austria-Hungary on the Eastern Front and occupied Eastern Galicia. Within a year the Austro-Hungarian Army and the Imperial German Army reoccupied the territory and counterattacked into Russian Poland in the Gorlice–Tarnów offensive. During the Imperial Russian Army's subsequent Great Retreat, it looted and abandoned the Kingdom of Poland, trying to emulate the scorched-earth policy adopted during the 1812 invasion. The Russians also evicted and deported hundreds of thousands of the area's inhabitants whom they suspected of collaborating with the enemy.

As the Russians retreated, the Central Powers occupied the area (1915); subsequently, they proposed the establishment of the Kingdom of Poland. In the March 1918 Treaty of Brest-Litovsk, Russia (by then embroiled in a civil war), effectively ceded all Polish territories it had formerly possessed to the German Empire and Austria-Hungary.

Administrative divisions

See also 
 Kresy
 Western Krai

Notes
a  Sources agree that after the fall of the January Uprising in 1864, the autonomy of Congress Poland was drastically reduced. However, they disagree on whether the state of the Kingdom of Poland (colloquially known as Congress Poland) was officially replaced by the Vistula land as a province of the Russian Empire, as many sources still use the term Congress Poland for the post-1864 period. The sources are also unclear as to when the Kingdom of Poland (or Vistula land) officially ceased to exist; some argue it ended with the assumption of control by the German and Austro-Hungarian occupying authorities; others, that it ended with the proclamation of the Regency Kingdom of Poland in 1916; finally, some argue that it occurred only with the creation of the independent Second Polish Republic in 1918. Examples:

 Polish Academy of Sciences, Institute of Geographical and Spatial Organization, p. 539, 
  Mimo wprowadzenia oficjalnej nazwy Kraj Przywiślański terminy Królestwo Polskie, Królestwo Kongresowe lub w skrócie Kongresówka były nadal używane, zarówno w języku potocznym jak i w niektórych publikacjach.
  Despite the introduction of the official name Vistula Land, terms such as, Kingdom of Poland, Congress Poland, or in short Kongresówka were still in use, both in everyday language and in some publications.
 POWSTANIE STYCZNIOWE, Encyklopedia Interia:
  po upadku powstania zlikwidowano ostatnie elementy autonomii Królestwa Pol. (łącznie z nazwą), przekształcając je w "Kraj Przywiślański";
  after the fall of the uprising the last elements of autonomy of the Kingdom of Poland (including the name) were abolished, transforming it into the "Vistula land";
 Królestwo Polskie. Encyklopedia WIEM:
  "Królestwo Polskie po powstaniu styczniowym: Nazwę Królestwa Polskiego zastąpiła, w urzędowej terminologii, nazwa Kraj Przywiślański." [...] "Po rewolucji 1905-1907 w Królestwie Polskim ..." [...] "W latach 1914-1916 Królestwo Polskie stało się...".
  "Kingdom of Poland after the January Uprising: the name Kingdom of Poland was replaced, in official documents, by the name of Vistula land." However the same article also inconsistently states: "After the revolution 1905-1907 in the Kingdom of Poland" and "In the years 1914-1916 the Kingdom of Poland became...".
 Królestwo Polskie, Królestwo Kongresowe, Encyklopedia PWN:
  1915–18 pod okupacją niem. i austro-węgierską; K.P. przestało istnieć po powstaniu II RP (XI 1918).
  [Congress Poland was] under German and Austro-Hungarian occupation from 1915 to 1918; K.P [abbreviation for Królestwo Polskie (Kingdom of Poland)] was finally abolished after the creation of the Second Polish Republic in November 1918

References

Further reading 
 Manfred Alexander: Kleine Geschichte Polens. Stuttgart: Reclam 2003 (Quelle)
 Roman Dmowski: Deutschland, Rußland und die polnische Frage (Auszüge). In: Polen und der Osten. Texte zu einem spannungsreichen Verhältnis. Hrg. Andrzej Chwalba,  (Denken und Wissen. Eine Polnische Bibliothek. Band 7)
 Hensel, Jürgen (ed.): Polen, Deutsche und Juden in Lodz 1820 - 1939. Eine schwierige Nachbarschaft, Osnabrück: fibre Verlag 1996

External links
 Sammlung historischer Landkarten zur deutsch-polnischen Geschichte

Congress Poland
Governorates-General of the Russian Empire
1867 establishments in Poland
1915 disestablishments in Poland
1867 establishments in the Russian Empire
1915 disestablishments in the Russian Empire
ru:Привислинский край